The Capella Javelin is a family of American open cockpit, high wing, tractor configuration, conventional landing gear-equipped ultralight aircraft that were produced in kit form by Capella Aircraft of Austin, Texas and intended for amateur construction.

The single seat Javelin I was designed to comply with the American FAR 103 ultralight regulations, including that category's maximum  empty weight.

Capella Aircraft went out of business in late 2007, and the type is no longer in production.

Design and development
The Javelin was introduced circa 1999 and was intended to appeal to pilots who wanted to experience totally open-air flight.

The design features an open frame fuselage of welded 4130 steel tubing, with the pilot's and passenger's seats bolted to the frame. The horizontal stabilizer and tail fin are also constructed of welded steel tubes. The wing is framed from riveted aluminium tubing with all flying surfaces covered in doped aircraft fabric. The wing is equipped with full span ailerons.

The conventional landing gear includes sprung-steel main gear and a similarly sprung steerable tail wheel. The open cockpit design provides good visibility while taxiing.

The standard engine supplied by the manufacturer for the single seat version was the  Rotax 277, but it was reported that the aircraft was underpowered with that engine installed. The throttle control is of a unique motorcycle grip type.

Original factory kit options included a cockpit pod and windshield, brakes and steel tube powder coating.

The single-seat Javelin was developed into a tandem two seater, designated the Javelin II and then  further developed into the T-Raptor ultralight trainer. The T-Raptor uses a wider and more enclosed fuselage, with optional bubble-windowed doors, to allow cool weather flying and was intended to be marketed to ultralight schools.

Variants
Javelin I
Single seat open cockpit ultralight powered by a  Rotax 277 engine.
Javelin II
Two seats-in-tandem open cockpit ultralight trainer powered by a  Rotax 503 engine. It was reported as being in development in 1998 and forecast to be available at the end of 1998.
T-Raptor
Two seats-in-tandem ultralight trainer powered by a  Rotax 503,  Rotax 582 or  HKS 700E four stroke engine. The T-Raptor has an expanded-width steel cage to provide a more enclosed cockpit and is a development of the Javelin II.

Specifications (Javelin I)

See also

References

Javelin
1990s United States ultralight aircraft
Homebuilt aircraft
Single-engined tractor aircraft
High-wing aircraft